Arancha Solis (born December 31, 1973), also known as Arancha del Toro, is a Spanish film, television, and theater actress.

Filmography

Films

Television

Theater

References

External links 
 
 

Living people
People from Madrid
1973 births
Spanish film actresses
Spanish television actresses
Spanish stage actresses